Grodzisk Wielkopolski  is a town in western Poland, in Greater Poland Voivodeship (Wielkopolskie), with a population of 13,703 (2006). It is the seat of Grodzisk Wielkopolski County, and also of the smaller administrative district called Gmina Grodzisk Wielkopolski. The suffix "Wielkopolski" distinguishes it from the town of Grodzisk Mazowiecki in east-central Poland.

History

The settlement was first mentioned in 1257 by the name of Grodisze in a document by
Przemysł I of Greater Poland. It was referred to as a village belonging to the Cistercians.

The exact date when the town received its charter is unknown. Documents say that the town definitely had its town charter in 1303. It was a private town of Polish noble families of Ostroróg and Opaliński, administratively located within the Poznań Voivodeship in the Greater Poland Province of the Polish Crown.

The first Jews settled in the town at the beginning of the 16th century. The first document to back this up was in 1505, mentioning the Jew Abraham of Grodzisk In Yiddish and Hebrew, the town is known as גרידץ (Gritz or Gritza)

Stanisław Ostroróg as a Lutheran in 1563 gave the local church to Protestants and he also founded a new school in the town. Grodzisk became an important printing center for the Polish Reformation, however in 1594 Jan Ostroróg as a supporter of Catholicism reintroduced Catholicism in the town.

In 1593, the census for Grodzisk Wielkopolski said that the population was approximately 1,160. The town charter was renewed with the inclusion of a new town about 150 metres from the old town. In 1601, the first privileges for the brewery were awarded. The town quickly became important for the production of beer (Grodziskie style). At the end of the 18th century, there were 53 breweries in the town. Also, traditions of meat production in the local butchers' guild date back to the 17th century, and today Grodzisk is known for its variety of traditional meat products (see Cuisine below). In 1626, the mayor of the city changed to the Opaliński family. They remained as mayors until 1775.

In 1793, the town was annexed by Prussia in the Second Partition of Poland. Grodzisk was an important insurgent center during the Polish Kościuszko Uprising in 1794. In 1807 it became part of the short-lived Polish Duchy of Warsaw, and in 1815 it was reannexed by Prussia, under the Germanized name Grätz. In the Greater Poland uprising (1848) during the Revolutions of 1848 a battle was fought between the Polish insurgents and Prussian troops in the present-day district of Doktorowo. From 1887 to 1918, it was the seat of Kreis Grätz.

In November 1918, after World War I, Poland regained independence, and in December local Poles formed armed units in attempt to rejoin Poland. Poles took control of the town without fighting, however volunteers from Grodzisk participated in the Greater Poland uprising in other places, as well as in the Polish–Soviet War. The town was confirmed as part of Poland in the 1919 Treaty of Versailles, and was until 1932 the seat of a county or powiat.

During World War II, the town was under German occupation. In Młyniewo, a nearby village, a transit camp was formed for onward transport to Nazi concentration camps, initially for Jews and later for Poles and French, Serbian, English and Soviet prisoners of war. Poles were also subjected to expulsions, the first of which was carried out in November 1939, nevertheless, the Polish resistance movement was active in the town. Several Poles from Grodzisk, including policemen, doctors, and a co-founder of the local Dyskobolia Grodzisk Wielkopolski football club, were murdered by the Russians in the large Katyn massacre in April–May 1940. The Germans operated a Nazi prison in the town. On January 27, 1945, the city was taken by the Red Army, and afterwards restored to Poland.

After World War II, beer production declined and was discontinued in 1993. In 1999, Grodzisk again became a powiat seat when the powiats were reintroduced in the Polish administrative reforms.

Culture
A historical museum called Muzeum Ziemi Grodziskiej is located in the town.

Cuisine

The Grodziskie style of beer originated in the town. Grodzisk is also known for its mineral water and traditional meat products. A commemorative pump stands in the central market square in front of the town hall.

The officially protected traditional foods originating from Grodzisk Wielkopolski (as designated by the Ministry of Agriculture and Rural Development of Poland) are various meat products, including kiełbasa grodziska, a local type of kiełbasa, salceson ozorowy grodziski, a local type of salceson, bułczanka grodziska, a local type of bułczanka (lunch meat made of pork, wheat roll and spices), and pasztetowa grodziska, a local type of pork pasztetowa (Polish liverwurst).

Sport
The local football team is Nasza Dyskobolia Grodzisk Wielkopolski. It plays in the lower leagues, but continues the traditions of Dyskobolia Grodzisk Wielkopolski which in the 1990s and 2000s competed in the Ekstraklasa, the country's top flight, finishing 2nd in 2003 and 2005, and also the winner of the 2007 Polish Cup.

Their stadium hosts many professional teams during the summer and winter breaks, and temporarily is the home of Warta Poznań whilst their stadium is being modernised.

International relations

Twin towns — Sister cities
Grodzisk Wielkopolski is twinned with:
 Betton, France
 Delligsen, Germany
 Merksplas, Belgium
 Torrelodones, Spain
 Biržai, Lithuania
 Dolyna, Ukraine

Notable people
Jonathan Alexandersohn (d.1869), rabbi 
Grzegorz Balcerek (born 1954), Roman Catholic bishop
Michał Drzymała (1857–1937), Polish national activist
Rudolf Mosse (1843–1920), publisher and philanthropist
Albert Mosse (1846–1925), German judge and legal scholar
Patrycja Piechowiak (born 1992), weightlifter
Franciszek Ścigalski (1782–1846), Polish composer, violinist and conductor
Włodzimierz Trzebiatowski (1906–1982), chemist, physicist and mathematician

Gallery

References

External links 
Jewish Encyclopedia: "Grätz" by Gotthard Deutsch & J. Friedmann (1906).
 

 
Grodzisk Wielkopolski County
Cities and towns in Greater Poland Voivodeship
Shtetls
Holocaust locations in Poland